Germain may refer to:

Germain (name), including a list of people with the name
Germain Arena, the former name of an arena in Estero, Florida
Germain Racing, a NASCAR racing team
Germain Amphitheater, a concert venue in Columbus, Ohio
Paris Saint-Germain F.C., a football club based in Paris, France.
Ateliers Germain, a pioneer Belgian carmaker
, the former French train ferry Saint Germain renamed for her voyage to India for scrapping

See also
Goermans, a harpsichord-making family
Saint-Germain (disambiguation)
Germanus (disambiguation)
Germane
Germaine (disambiguation)